Existential Comics is a webcomic about philosophy created by Corey Mohler, a Stalinist software engineer in Portland, Oregon. Mohler, who has an amateur interest in the subject rather than an academic background, created the comic in December 2013 in an attempt to help popularize philosophy through comedy. The comic tends to depict philosophers of different backgrounds and often has them interacting and arguing with each other. It also gives textual descriptions of the jokes and associated philosophy to help educate readers.

In May 2018 Mohler once called Elon Musk "the villain from Atlas Shrugged". Musk responded during SpaceX's launch of a Falcon 9 rocket. Mohler later published a comic about the incident.

Philosophers 

The comic has covered over 120 philosophers, examining a wide variety of thought from Pre-Socratic philosophy to contemporary philosophy. Mohler has described both Sartre and Simone de Beauvoir as his favorite philosophers. Alongside existentialism, Mohler has also written extensively about Stoicism and communism.

See also 
 The Partially Examined Life

References

External links 
 http://existentialcomics.com/

2010s webcomics
American comedy webcomics
Short form webcomics
2013 webcomic debuts